Galway South was a parliamentary constituency represented in Dáil Éireann, the lower house of the Irish parliament or Oireachtas from 1948 to 1961. The constituency elected 3 deputies (Teachtaí Dála, commonly known as TDs) to the Dáil, on the system of proportional representation by means of the single transferable vote (PR-STV).

History 
The constituency was created under the Electoral (Amendment) Act 1947 for the 1948 general election to Dáil Éireann. It was abolished under the Electoral (Amendment) Act 1961, when it was partially replaced by the new constituency of Galway East.

Boundaries 
The constituency comprised the district electoral divisions of:

TDs

Elections

1958 by-election 
Following the death of Fianna Fáil TD Patrick Beegan, a by-election was held on 30 May 1958. The seat was won by the Fianna Fáil candidate Anthony Millar.

1957 general election

1954 general election

1953 by-election 
Following the death of Fianna Fáil TD Frank Fahy, a by-election was held on 21 August 1953. The seat was won by the Fianna Fáil candidate Robert Lahiffe.

1951 general election

1948 general election

See also
Politics of the Republic of Ireland
Historic Dáil constituencies
Elections in the Republic of Ireland

References

External links
Oireachtas Members Database

Dáil constituencies in the Republic of Ireland (historic)
Historic constituencies in County Galway
1948 establishments in Ireland
1961 disestablishments in Ireland
Constituencies established in 1948
Constituencies disestablished in 1961